This article contains information about the literary events and publications of 1830.

Events
February – Barthold Georg Niebuhr's house burns down, but most of his books are saved.
February 25 – The première of Victor Hugo's play Hernani in Paris elicits protests from an audience seeing it as an attack on Classicism.
March 26 – The Book of Mormon is published by Joseph Smith in Palmyra, New York.
May 22 – Amos Bronson Alcott marries Abby May at King's Chapel, Boston (Massachusetts).
May 24 – Sarah Josepha Hale's Poems for Our Children, including "Mary's Lamb", with the verse "Mary Had a Little Lamb", is published by Marsh, Capen & Lyon in Boston, Massachusetts.
July or later – Victor Cousin is elected to the Académie française to replace Joseph Fourier.
July 1 – Edgar Allan Poe matriculates as a cadet at the United States Military Academy, West Point.
August – François-René de Chateaubriand sacrifices his political career by refusing to swear an oath of allegiance to Louis-Philippe, and retires to write his memoirs.
August 25 – Belgian Revolution breaks out; Flemish novelist Hendrik Conscience takes the side of the revolutionaries.
December – Elizabeth Vestris becomes the first female actor-manager in the history of London theatre by leasing the Olympic Theatre in Drury Lane where she presents extravaganzas and burlesques.
unknown dates
James Mill becomes head of the London office of the British East India Company.
The English publishers Bradbury and Evans are established as printers by William Bradbury and Frederick Mullet Evans.
Edward Moxon begins his own publishing business in London.
The famous opening line of Edward Bulwer-Lytton's (anonymous) novel, Paul Clifford, published this year, begins: "It was a dark and stormy night; the rain fell in torrents — except at occasional intervals, when it was checked by a violent gust of wind which swept up the streets (for it is in London that our scene lies), rattling along the housetops, and fiercely agitating the scanty flame of the lamps that struggled against the darkness."

New books

Fiction
Honoré de Balzac
La Maison du chat-qui-pelote
La Vendetta
Le Bal de Sceaux
Gobseck
 Lady Charlotte Bury 
 The Exclusives
 The Separation
Edward Bulwer-Lytton – Paul Clifford
James Fenimore Cooper – The Water-Witch
 Thomas Colley Grattan – The Heiress of Bruges
Oliver Wendell Holmes – Old Ironsides
John Neal — Authorship, a Tale
Thomas Love Peacock – Crotchet Castle
Anna Maria Porter – The Barony
Catharine Maria Sedgwick – A Tale of Our Times
Mary Shelley – The Fortunes of Perkin Warbeck
Louisa Stanhope – The Corsair's Bride
Stendhal – The Red and the Black  (Le Rouge et le Noir)
Princess Victoria – The Adventures of Alice Laselles (first published 2015)

Children
Frederick Marryat – The King's Own
Anna Maria Hall – Chronicles of a School-Room

Drama
Henrik Hertz – Amor's Strokes of Genius (Amors Genistreger)
Douglas William Jerrold – The Mutiny at the Nore
Jovan Sterija Popović – Laža i Paralaža 
Aleksandr Pushkin – Little Tragedies (Маленькие трагедии, Malenkie tragedii)
The Stone Guest (Каменный гость, Kamenny gost)
Mozart and Salieri (Моцарт и Сальери, Mozart i Salieri)
The Miserly Knight (Скупой рыцарь, Skupoy rytsar)
A Feast in Time of Plague (Пир во время чумы, Pir vo vremya chumy)
Sir Walter Scott (published, never performed)
Auchindrane
The Doom of Devorgoil

Poetry
Alphonse de Lamartine – Harmonies poétiques et religieuses
Richard Lower – Tom Cladpole's Jurney to Lunnon, told by himself, and written in pure Sussex doggerel by his Uncle Tim
Alfred de Musset – Comtes d'Espagne et d'Italie
Caroline Norton – The Undying One and Other Poems (includes "The Arab's Farewell to His Horse")
Charles Augustin Sainte-Beuve – Les Consolations
Alfred Tennyson – Poems, Chiefly Lyrical

Non-fiction
Jeremy Bentham – Constitutional Code for All Nations
William Cobbett – Rural Rides
Humphry Davy (posthumous) – Consolations in Travel; or, The Last Days of a Philosopher
Denis Diderot (posthumous) – La Promenade du sceptique
Jacob Grimm – Hymnorum veteris ecclesiae XXVI. inter pretatio theodisca
John Hughes, editor – The Boscobel Tracts
Samuel Lee – Six Sermons on the Study of the Holy Scriptures, to Which are Annexed Two Dissertations
Charles Lyell – Principles of Geology, vol. 1
Thomas Moore – Letters and Journals of Lord Byron, with Notices of his Life
Hermann, Fürst von Pückler-Muskau – Briefe eines Verstorbenen (4 volumes to 1831, Tour of a German Prince, 4 vols, 1831–32)
Joseph Smith – The Book of Mormon

Births
January 2 – Henry Kingsley, English novelist (died 1876)
January 28 – Martha Foster Crawford, American writer and missionary (died 1909)
February 28 – James Payn, English novelist (died 1898)
March 15 – Paul Heyse, German writer and Nobel laureate (died 1914)
March 18 – Numa Denis Fustel de Coulanges, French historian (died 1889)
March 25 – Frederick Greenwood, English novelist and man of letters (died 1909)
April 6 – Eugène Rambert, Swiss poet and writer (died 1886)
April 21 – Mary A. Brayton Woodbridge, American editor and reformer (died 1894)
May 17 – Sarah Gibson Humphreys, American author and suffragist (died 1907)
May 20 – Hector Malot, French writer (died 1907)
July 22 – Richard Copley Christie, English scholar (died 1902)
September 8 – Frédéric Mistral, French poet (died 1914)
September 2 – Josefina Wettergrund, Swedish writer (died 1903)
September 11 – Frances Freeling Broderip (née Hood), English children's writer (died 1878)
October 15 – Helen Hunt Jackson, American writer and activist (died 1885)
October 30 – Eliza Brightwen (née Elder), Scottish naturalist (died 1906)
December 5 – Christina Rossetti, English poet (died 1894) 
December 10 – Emily Dickinson, American poet (died 1886)
December 17 – Jules de Goncourt, French founder of Prix Goncourt (died 1870)
unknown date – Mary Anna Needell (Mrs. J. H. Needell), English novelist (died 1922)

Deaths
January 17 or 30 – Wilhelm Waiblinger, German Romantic poet (born 1804)
January 26 – Maria Petronella Woesthoven, Dutch poet (died 1760)
February 15 – Prince Ioane of Georgia, Georgian encyclopedist (born 1768)
February 20 – Robert Anderson, Scottish literary editor, biographer and critic (born 1750)
February 25 – Henrietta Maria Bowdler, English author and expurgator (born 1750)
March 29 – James Rennell, English historian and oceanographer (born 1742)
April 16 – József Katona, Hungarian dramatist and poet (born 1791)
August 6 – David Walker, African American abolitionist (born 1785)
August 20 – Vasily Pushkin, Russian poet (born 1766)
September 18 – William Hazlitt, English essayist (born 1778)
October 8 – Johann Gottfried Ebel, Prussian-born Swiss travel writer (born 1764)
By November – Mary Diana Dods, Scottish writer known as "David Lyndsay", later "Walter Sholto Douglas" (born 1790)
November 20 – Gustav von Ewers, German legal historian (born 1781)
December 8 – Benjamin Constant, Swiss-born French liberal author (born 1767)
December 31 – Stéphanie Félicité, comtesse de Genlis, French dramatist and writer on education (born 1746)

Awards
Newdigate Prize – George Kettilby Rickards

References

 
Years of the 19th century in literature